Enrique "Equi" Barrera Magalona Sr. (November 5, 1891 – 1960) was a Filipino lawyer and politician who served as Senator of the Philippines. Prior to being elected in the Senate, he served as Municipal President of Saravia, Negros Occidental (now named in his honor) and a Representative/Assemblyman from Negros Occidental. He was the grandfather of the late Filipino rap icon Francis Magalona.

Early life
Enrique B. Magalona was born in Saravia, Negros Occidental (now Enrique B. Magalona, Negros Occidental) on November 5, 1891 to Vicente Magalona y Ledesma and Augusta Barrera y Majarocan.

Personal life
He was married to Consuelo Lozada Gayoso with 3 children including Enrique G. Magalona, Jr.

Education
He studied in Molo Institute, Iloilo where he obtained both his primary and secondary education. He graduated at San Juan de Letran with the degree of Bachelor of Arts in 1907 and La Jurisprudencia where he received his Bachelor of Laws degree in 1911.

Political life
He was elected Municipal President of Saravia in 1922 and re-elected to the same post in 1925. In 1926, he was elected President of the Municipal Presidents Convention at Bacolod, Negros Occidental. Senator Magalona was elected representative to the ninth and tenth Philippine Legislature from 1931 to 1934, and then, later elected assemblyman from the first district of Negros Occidental in 1935 and re-elected in 1938. He was elected Senator for two terms from 1946 to 1949 and from 1949 to 1955. Senator Magalona was chairman of the Committees on Accounts and Civil Service; Rules; Public Health; Labor and Immigration and National Exterprises. As lawmaker he authored, among others Republic Act. 342 (Moratorium Act); R.A. 611 (cumulative computation of vacation and sick leaves) and R.A. No. 709 (instruction of Spanish in colleges and universities).

Death
Enrique Magalona, Sr. died in 1960.

References

See also
Pancho Magalona
Tita Duran
Francis Magalona
Maxene Magalona
Saab Magalona
Elmo Magalona
Frank Magalona
Hiro Peralta

1891 births
1960 deaths
People from Negros Occidental
Filipino Roman Catholics
Mayors of places in Negros Occidental
Members of the House of Representatives of the Philippines from Negros Occidental
Senators of the 3rd Congress of the Philippines
Senators of the 2nd Congress of the Philippines
Senators of the 1st Congress of the Philippines
Enrique
Colegio de San Juan de Letran alumni
Members of the Philippine Legislature
Members of the National Assembly of the Philippines